Christy Yiu Kit-Ching (Chinese: 姚潔貞 born 20 February 1988) is a long-distance runner from Hong Kong. She competed in the marathon event at the 2015 World Championships in Athletics in Beijing, China and the 2016 Olympic Games.

Career
Yiu finished 39th in the women's marathon at the 2016 Olympic Games in Rio de Janeiro, setting a new personal best and national record with a time of two hours 36 minutes and 11 seconds.

In 2020, she competed in the women's half marathon at the 2020 World Athletics Half Marathon Championships held in Gdynia, Poland.

Personal bests
1500 metres – 4:32.63 min, 29 Jun 2014, Hong Kong (HKG)
3000 metres Steeplechase – 10:25.81 min, 9 Oct 2013, Tianjin (CHN) - HKR
5000 metres – 16:01.88 min, 7 May 2016, Nobeoka (JPN)
10,000 metres – 33:45.00 min, 16 July 2015, Abashiri (JPN)
10km – 33:48 min, 17 October 2020, Gdynia (POR) - HKR
15km – 51:06 min, 17 October 2020, Gdynia (POR) - HKR
Half marathon – 1:12:10 hrs, 17 October 2020, Gdynia (POR) - HKR
Marathon – 2:31:24 hrs, 6 May 2021, Milano (ITA) - HKR

See also
 Hong Kong at the 2015 World Championships in Athletics

References

External links

http://www.scmp.com/sport/hong-kong/article/1785233/yiu-kit-ching-qualifies-2016-rio-olympics-and-world-championships
http://www.scmp.com/video/hong-kong/1989085/road-rio-marathon-runner-christy-yiu-kit-ching-shares-how-her-husband-helped

1988 births
Living people
Place of birth missing (living people)
Hong Kong female long-distance runners
World Athletics Championships athletes for Hong Kong
Athletes (track and field) at the 2016 Summer Olympics
Olympic athletes of Hong Kong
Hong Kong female marathon runners